İstisu (in Azerbaijani) is a village in the Kalbajar District of Azerbaijan. 

Situated in a river valley, Istisu has historically been a resort town, and during the Soviet period, it attracted people from all over the USSR to be treated at the mineral-springs baths located in the area.

History 
In the early Middle Ages, the royal baths of the rulers of Caucasian Albania were located here. There is a resort in the town, known as Istisu resort.

The village was located in the Armenian-occupied territories surrounding Nagorno-Karabakh, coming under the control of ethnic Armenian forces during the First Nagorno-Karabakh War in the early 1990s. The village subsequently became part of the breakaway Republic of Artsakh as part of its Shahumyan Province, referred to as Jermajur. In 2018 it was reported that work has begun on a privately funded factory to produce mineral water. It was returned to Azerbaijan on 25 November 2020 as part of the 2020 Nagorno-Karabakh ceasefire agreement.

See also 
 Istisu resort

References

External links 

 

Populated places in Kalbajar District
Resorts in Azerbaijan